Zhoodar Kochkonbaev (born 24 April 1995) is a Kyrgyzstani long-distance runner.

In 2019, he competed in the senior men's race at the 2019 IAAF World Cross Country Championships held in Aarhus, Denmark. He finished in 127th place.

References

External links 
 

Living people
1995 births
Place of birth missing (living people)
Kyrgyzstani male long-distance runners
Kyrgyzstani male cross country runners